Vasily Bezsmelnitsyn (born 18 January 1975) is a Russian former alpine skier who competed in the 1994 Winter Olympics and 1998 Winter Olympics.

External links
 sports-reference.com
 

1975 births
Living people
Russian male alpine skiers
Olympic alpine skiers of Russia
Alpine skiers at the 1994 Winter Olympics
Alpine skiers at the 1998 Winter Olympics
Place of birth missing (living people)
20th-century Russian people